Senator Pagán may refer to:

Bolívar Pagán (1897–1961), Senate of Puerto Rico
Carlos Pagán (born 1954), Senate of Puerto Rico